The 432d Fighter-Interceptor Squadron is an inactive United States Air Force unit.  Its last assignment was with the 475th Fighter Group at Minneapolis-Saint Paul International Airport, Minnesota, where it was inactivated on 2 January 1958.

History

World War II and Army of Occupation
Combat in Southwest Pacific and Western Pacific, 12 August 1943 – 21 July 1945.  Occupation duty (Korea and Japan), 1945–1949.

Air defense operations

Air Defense of Upper Midwest, 1952–1958.

Lineage
 Activated on 14 May 1943 by special authority prior to constitution as 432d Fighter Squadron on 15 May 1943
 Inactivated on 1 April 1949
 Redesignated 432d Fighter-Interceptor Squadron on 10 October 1952
 Activated on 1 December 1952
 Inactivated on 2 January 1958

Assignments
 475th Fighter Group, 14 May 1943 – 1 April 1949
 31st Air Division, 1 December 1952
 520th Air Defense Group, 16 February 1953
 475th Fighter Group, 18 August 1955 – 2 January 1958

Stations

 Charters Towers, Australia, 14 May 1943
 RAAF Base Amberley, Australia, 11 June 1943
 Dobodura Airfield Complex, New Guinea, 14 August 1943
 Operated from Port Moresby Airfield Complex, New Guinea, 12 August – 1 September 1943
 Nadzab Airfield Complex, New Guinea, 25 March 1944
 Hollandia Airfield Complex, New Guinea, 15 May 1944
 Mokmer Airfield, Biak, Netherlands East Indies, 12 July 1944
 Dulag Airfield, Leyte, 2 November 1944
 Detachment operated from San Jose, Mindoro, Netherlands East Indies, 5 February – 2 March 1945
 Clark Field, Luzon, Philippines, 27 February 1945
 Lingayen Airfield, Luzon, Philippines, 19 April 1945
 Ie Shima Airfield, Okinawa, 8 August 1945
 Kimpo Air Base, Korea, 28 September 1945
 Itazuke Air Base, Japan, 28 August 1948
 Ashiya Air Base, Japan, 25 March – 1 April 1949
 Truax Field, Wisconsin, 10 October 1952
 Minneapolis-Saint Paul International Airport, Minnesota, 18 August 1955 – 2 January 1958

Aircraft

 Lockheed P-38 Lightning, 1943–1946
 North American P-51 Mustang, 1946–1949
 North American F-86D Sabre, 1952–1955
 Northrop F-89D Scorpion, 1955–1956
 Northrop F-89H Scorpion, 1956–1957

References

Notes
 Explanatory notes

 Citations

Bibliography

External links

Fighter squadrons of the United States Air Force
Aerospace Defense Command units